The 1973 Miami Toros season was the first season of the new team, and the club's seventh season in professional soccer.  It is also the first ever incarnation of the club's new name.  Previously, there were known as the Miami Gatos.
This year, the team finished in third place in the Eastern Division.  They did not make the North American Soccer League playoffs.

Background

Review

Competitions

NASL regular season

Regular season
W = Wins, L = Losses, T= Ties, GF = Goals For, GA = Goals Against, BP = Bonus Points, PTS= Total Points

POINT SYSTEM 
6 points for a win, 3 points for a tie, 0 points for a loss, 1 bonus point for each goal scored up to three per game.

Results summaries

Results by round

Match reports

Statistics

Transfers

See also 
Miami Toros 1973

References 

1973
Miami
Miami Toros
Miami